Huang Jianxin (born 14 June 1954) is a Chinese filmmaker. He also writes film scripts under the pen name Huang Xin. He is normally considered part of the fifth generation of Chinese filmmakers (a group that includes Chen Kaige, Zhang Yimou and Tian Zhuangzhuang), due to shared traits in his works, although he was not a strictly a member of the inaugural 1982 class of the Beijing Film Academy. Additionally, Huang's films are distinguished from his contemporaries in that they focused on urban contemporary life, as contrasted to historical dramas, as well as for their satirical observations of the Chinese bureaucracy.

Biography 
Huang was born in Xi'an, though his ancestral hometown was in Hebei. He joined the army at age 16, and enrolled in Northwest University in 1975. Huang entered Xi'an Film Studio after graduation, evolving from editor, script holder, assistant director to vice director. After training at Beijing Film Academy in 1983, he was elevated to director. He is now the manager of 4th production company of China Film Corporation. His 1997 film Surveillance was entered into the 47th Berlin International Film Festival.

Filmography

References

External links 

1954 births
Living people
Film directors from Shaanxi
Chinese film producers
Artists from Xi'an
Beijing Film Academy alumni
Chinese film directors
Northwest University (China) alumni